Baba can be a surname in a few cultures such as Japanese, Assyrian, Russian, etc. It is also a nickname for father in a few languages. Baba also translates to "father" in the Arabic and Shona languages. Note, in various Slavic languages "baba" means an [old] lady (as in diminutive variation babushka).

First name
Baba Brinkman, Canadian environmental rapper
Baba Ishak (died 1241), Seljuk Turkish preacher who led a revolt against the Seljuq Sultanate of Rûm
Baba Jan (politician) (born 1974), Pakistani political activist
Baba Nobuharu (1514–1575), samurai of Japan's Sengoku period under Takeda Shingen
Abdul Baba Rahman (born 1994), Ghanaian footballer

Nickname
Starina Novak (–1601), a Serbian hajduk, also known as "Baba Novac" ("Old Novak") in Romanian
Raila Odinga (born 1945), Kenyan politician and 2nd Prime Minister of Kenya (2008–2013)
Sanjay Dutt (born 1959), Indian film actor and producer

Surname
 Corneliu Baba (1906–1997), Romanian painter
 Frank Shozo Baba (1915–2008), Japanese American worked for Voice of America and Japan
 Ghafar Baba (1925–2006), Malaysian politician
 Gül Baba (died 1541), Ottoman Bektashi dervish poet
 James Baba (born 1945), Ugandan politician
 Jaroslav Bába (born 1984), Czech high jumper
Kenji Baba (born 1985), Japanese footballer
 Kikutaro Baba (1905–2001), Japanese malacologist
 Masao Baba (1892–1947), Japanese general
 Baba Nobuharu (1514/15–1575), Japanese samurai
 Otman Baba (–1478), Sufi saint
 , Japanese artistic gymnast
Shigeru Baba (born 1948), Japanese professional go player
 Shohei Baba (1938–1999), Japanese wrestler
Sumie Baba (born 1967), Japanese voice actress
 Tadao Baba (born 1944), Japanese motorcycle engineer
Toru Baba (born 1988), Japanese entertainer
 Tupeni Baba, Fijian politician
 Yudai Baba (born 1995), Japanese basketball player
 Yuki Baba (born 1992), Japanese politician
Yuta Baba (born 1984), Japanese expatriate footballer in South Korea

Honorific
The following have adopted the honorific Baba:
Baba Ram Das (1931–2019), born Richard Alpert, American spiritual teacher and psychologist 
Baba Ramdevji (1352–1385), a Hindu ruler venerated as a folk deity in Gujarat and Rajasthan
Baba Bulleh Shah (1680–1757), a Punjabi philosopher and Sufi poet
Demir Baba, a 16th-century Alevi saint
Gül Baba (died 1541), an Ottoman Bektashi dervish poet
Meher Baba (1894-1969), born Merwan Sheriar Irani, Indian guru
Otman Baba ( – 8 Receb 1478), a dervish traveling throughout the Ottoman Empire
Rehman Baba (1632–1706), an Afghan Sufi Dervish and poet
Sai Baba of Shirdi (–1918), Indian guru
Sathya Sai Baba (1926–2011), born Sathya Narayana Raju, Indian guru purporting to be a reincarnation of Sai Baba of Shirdi
Sersem Ali Baba, a 16th-century Ottoman dervish

Turkish-language surnames
Turkish masculine given names
Arabic-language surnames
Japanese-language surnames
Romanian-language surnames